Scots dialect can refer to:
Scottish English, the varieties of the English language spoken in Scotland
The Scots language or one of the dialects therein
 Scots dialects
 Doric dialect (Scotland), the dialect of North Eastern Scotland